Esherick may refer to: 

 Craig Esherick (born 1956), basketball coach
 Joseph Esherick (architect) (1914–1998), American architect  
 Joseph W. Esherick (born 1942), historian of Chinese history
 Wharton Esherick (1887–1970), American woodcarver and printmaker
 Esherick House, Chestnut Hill, Pennsylvania